Reservoir Dogs is a 2006 third-person shooter video game based on the Quentin Tarantino film of the same name. It garnered mostly low reviews and caused minor controversies for its heavy violence, being banned in Germany, Australia and New Zealand.

Plot
The game follows the same plot as the film, only expanding it and showing the events and planning of the heist in more detail. The plot concerns eight criminals who undertake a jewelry heist, six of whom use aliases, Mr. Blonde, Mr. White, Mr. Pink, Mr. Orange, Mr. Blue, Mr. Brown, and the men responsible for planning the heist Joe and his son Eddie Cabot. During the heist, the cops arrive before the expected response time, indicating that one of the crew has tipped the cops off. Blonde, infuriated by this, goes on a shooting spree, almost jeopardising the mission. Mr. Pink manages to escape with the diamonds and hide them in a secure location. He then meets Mr. White and Mr. Orange (who has been shot and is severely bleeding) at a warehouse, as Brown was killed and Blue and Blonde are missing. After Pink and White argue about whether or not to take Orange to a hospital, Blonde arrives.

Blonde reveals that he has a tied-up police officer in the trunk of his car. After beating the cop to extract information, Eddie arrives before leaving with White and Pink to retrieve the diamonds and ditch the getaway vehicles. After the three depart, Blonde begins to torture the cop, slashing his face and slicing off his ear. He then attempts to set the cop on fire before he is shot dead by a still bleeding Orange. Orange reveals to the cop that he is an undercover cop and that backup is waiting for Joe to arrive at the warehouse before moving in. Earlier during the heist, Blue makes a last stand against the cops before being killed in a movie theater.

In the present, Eddie, Joe, Pink and White return with the diamonds and see Blonde dead. After killing the cop, Eddie confronts Orange as to why he killed Blonde, an old family friend who served four years in jail for his father's crime, accuses him of being the mole who set the job up, and threatens to kill him. White then threatens to kill both Joe and Eddie if they shoot Orange. Joe and Eddie aim at Orange while White aims at both Cabots, creating a Mexican standoff. They all fire, killing the Cabots and hitting both White and Orange. Pink, the only person who hasn't been shot, runs away with the diamonds. After White and Orange share a moment, Orange confesses he is a cop. White then points the gun at Orange's head, but police storm the warehouse before he can shoot. The police order White to surrender, but shoots Orange before being shot and killed himself by the police.

Gameplay 
The game consists of both third-person shooting and driving sections.
The game mechanics encourage the player to take hostages and avoid mass slaughter: in the rating system, a player may be rated as a "Psycho" if many opponents are killed, or a "Professional" if they are not.

Soundtrack 
It also features the full and original soundtrack from the movie, the so-called  K-Billy's Super Sounds of the Seventies.

Characters
Michael Madsen reprising his role as Mr. Blonde/Vic Vega
Jack McGee as Mr. White/Larry
Scott Menville as Mr. Orange/Freddy Newandyke
Weetus Cren as Mr. Pink 
Michael Cornacchia as "Nice Guy" Eddie Cabot
Joe Hanna as Joe Cabot
Khary Payton as Mr. Blue
Alex Dee as Mr. Brown

Reception

Critical reviews

The game received "mixed" reviews on all platforms according to the review aggregation website Metacritic.

Censorship
The game has been refused classification in Germany and Australia, essentially banning the game from sale in both countries. The Australia Classification Board found it could not be accommodated at the MA 15+ classification, and as such, the game has been made unavailable for sale or hire, or would not be demonstrated in Australia.

The New Zealand Office of Film and Literature Classification dubbed the game "objectionable", meaning it was not only banned from sale, but that it was illegal to possess or import a copy. The Office found the game "tends to promote and support the infliction of extreme violence and extreme cruelty…for the purpose of entertainment". For the same reasons as Australia and New Zealand, the game has not been officially released in Japan, but the film of the same name remains available. In Germany, the game was indexed by the Federal Department for Media Harmful to Young Persons.

References

External links
 

2006 video games
Organized crime video games
PlayStation 2 games
Quentin Tarantino
Third-person shooters
Obscenity controversies in video games
Censored video games
Video games based on films
Video games set in Los Angeles
Windows games
Xbox games
Video games set in 1992
Eidos Interactive games
Single-player video games
Video games developed in the United Kingdom